Insomnia is a sleep disorder.

Insomnia may also refer to:

Companies
 Insomnia Coffee Company, a chain of coffee shops in the Republic of Ireland
 Insomnia Cookies, a chain of bakeries in the US
 Insomnia Publications, a defunct UK comic-book publisher

Film and television
 Insomnia (1997 film), a Norwegian thriller directed by Erik Skjoldbjærg
 Insomnia (2002 film), an American remake of the Norwegian film, directed by Christopher Nolan
 Insomnia, a Brazilian television show hosted by Jackeline Petkovic

Literature
 Insomnia (novel), a 1994 novel by Stephen King
 Insomnia, a 2005 short-story collection by Jeremy Robinson
 Insomnia, a 2015 poetry collection by Linda Pastan

Music
 Insomnia (band), a Bengali rock band
 Insomnia (composition), an orchestral piece by Esa-Pekka Salonen, 2002
 Insomnia Festival, an annual electronic music festival in Tromsø, Norway

Albums
 Insomnia (Chihiro Onitsuka album), 2001
 Insomnia (Erick Sermon album), 1996
 Insomnia (Hed PE album), 2007
 Insomnia (soundtrack), from the 1997 film, by Biosphere
 Insomnia: The Best of Faithless or the title song (see below), 2009
 Insomnia (The Hiatus EP) or the title song, 2009
 Insomnia (Washington EP) or the title song, 2011
 Insomnia (Skepta, Chip and Young Adz album), 2020
 Insomnia, by Deinonychus, 2004
 Insomnia, a mixtape by The Alchemist, 2003

Songs
 "Insomnia" (Craig David song), 2008
 "Insomnia" (Daya song), 2019
 "Insomnia" (Faithless song), 1995
 "Insomnia" (Feeder song), 1999
 "Insomnia", by Ashley Tisdale from Symptoms, 2019
 "Insomnia", by Audien, 2015
 "Insomnia", by Caroline Polachek from Pang, 2019
 "Insomnia", by Coldrain from The Side Effects, 2019
 "Insomnia", by Cynthia Alexander from Insomnia & Other Lullabyes, 1996
 "Insomnia", by Ellen Benediktson during Melodifestivalen 2015
 "Insomnia", by Haken from Visions, 2011
 "Insomnia", by Jelena Karleuša from Diva, 2012
 "Insomnia", by Kamelot from Haven, 2015
 "Insomnia", by Koop Arponen from New Town, 2009
 "Insomnia", by L2, 2012
 "Insomnia", by Megadeth from Risk, 1999
 "Insomnia", by Periphery from Periphery, 2010
 "Insomnia", by Pete Philly and Perquisite from Mindstate, 2005
 "Insomnia", by The Records from Shades in Bed (also known as The Records), 1979
 "Insomnia", by Silverchair from Young Modern, 2007
 "Insomnia", by Stray Kids from I Am Who, 2018
 "Insomnia", by Takeoff from The Last Rocket, 2018
 "Insomnia", by the Veronicas, a B-side of the single "Hook Me Up", 2007
 "Insomnia", by Yellow Magic Orchestra from Solid State Survivor, 1979
 "Insomnia", by Zayn from Icarus Falls, 2018

Technology

 Insomnia, an open-source API design and testing platform owned by Kong Inc.

See also
 Insomniac (disambiguation)
 Insomnio (disambiguation)
 "Insomya", a song by the Eraserheads from Circus